Saline Landing is an unincorporated community in northeast Hardin County, Illinois, United States. Saline Landing is located on the Ohio River at the mouth of the Saline River.

It is adjacent to Saline Island which is listed on the National Register of Historic Places.

References

Unincorporated communities in Hardin County, Illinois
Unincorporated communities in Illinois
Illinois populated places on the Ohio River